Cackle may refer to:

 A form of laughter, often an evil laughter
 Miss Cackle, a character in the novel series The Worst Witch by Jill Murphy
 Mr. Cackle, a character in the 1962 Looney Tunes cartoon The Slick Chick

See also 
 
 Cackle Street (disambiguation), three hamlets in East Sussex
 Crackle (disambiguation)